The Deception Pass ferry was a ferry route in Washington State that ran between Fidalgo Island and Whidbey Island across Deception Pass.

History
A ferry across Deception Pass was first proposed by Island and Skagit county commissioners in 1912, and was definitely in operation by 1914.    From 1924 to 1935, the route was run by Berte H. Olson (1882-1959), and her husband, O.A. Olson, who held a state highway contract.  Berte Olson was the first woman to hold a ferry captain's license in Washington state.

The Olsons had a ferry built specifically for the route. The fee for car and driver was 50 cents, with 10 cents additional for every extra passenger, with "extra large" cars paying 75 cents. Service was hourly, and the transit time was only five minutes. Patrons were cautioned that the schedule was "subject to storms, breakdowns, and conditions beyond our control."

Discontinuation
The route was discontinued when the Deception Pass Bridge was completed in 1935.  For years, Berte Olson fought a political struggle against the bridge, even persuading Governor Roland Hartley to veto a funding bill that had been unanimously passed by the Washington State legislature in 1929.  Eventually she was defeated, but she became known as a strong-willed person.

Notes

References
 Long, Priscella, Deception Pass and Canoe Pass bridges are dedicated on July 31, 1935.HistoryLink.org Essay 5698, May 5, 2004
 Kline, Mary S., and Bayless, G.A., Ferryboats -- A Legend on Puget Sound, Bayless Books, Seattle, WA 1983 
 Newell, Gordon R. ed., H.W. McCurdy Marine History of the Pacific Northwest,  Superior Publishing, Seattle WA 1966 

Ferry routes in western Washington (state)
Transportation in Skagit County, Washington
History of Skagit County, Washington
Transportation in Island County, Washington
History of Island County, Washington
1910s establishments in Washington (state)
1935 disestablishments in Washington (state)